Johnson City Central School District is a school district in Johnson City, New York, United States.

Schools

High school
Johnson City High School, 666 Reynolds Road, Johnson City, NY 13790

Middle school
Johnson City Middle School, 601 Columbia Drive, Johnson City, NY 13790

Elementary school
Johnson City Elementary School, 601 Columbia Drive, Johnson City, NY 13790

Creating the Ideal School
Albert Mamary was superintendent of schools in Johnson City from 1982-1992 and a proponent of outcome-based education.
In 2007, Rowman & Littlefield Education published Mamary's book on his approach to improving school outcomes in a school district with many an economically deprived families, Creating the Ideal School.

References

External links

School districts in New York (state)
Education in Broome County, New York